Thomas Samuel Fenwick Seymour (born 1 July 1988) is a Scottish former professional rugby union player. He made 55 international appearances for the Scotland national rugby union team 2013–2019, scoring 20 tries which placed him fourth-top try scorer for the country. He played in two world cups and the 2017 British & Irish Lions tour to New Zealand. His regular playing position is wing.

Early life
Seymour was born in Nashville and spent his first nine years in the United States before his father's job took the family overseas, first to Dubai for eighteen months and later to Belfast. He attended Down High School.

Club career

Seymour was drafted to Marr RFC in the Scottish Premiership for the 2017-18 season.
Seymour was drafted to Currie in the Scottish Premiership for the 2018-19 season.

Seymour played for Glasgow Warriors in the Pro14, having previously represented Ulster. He was named in the Pro12 Dream Teams at the end of the 2014/15 and 2016/17 seasons. In April 2021 he announced his retirement from all professional rugby.

International career

Qualifying to play internationally for Scotland through his Glasgow-born mother, on 24 October 2012 he was named in the full Scottish national team for the 2012 end-of-year rugby union tests. In November 2014 he scored two tries from interceptions against Argentina and New Zealand and followed it up with a try against Tonga.

In April 2017 Seymour was named as one of two Scottish players selected for the initial British & Irish Lions squad to tour New Zealand in June and July.  While not featuring in any of the test matches he appeared in four games on tour scoring one try against the Highlanders and two tries against the Hurricanes.  His three tries meant he was the leading try scorer on tour.

In December 2019 Seymour announced his retirement from playing international rugby.

International tries

References

http://www.glasgowwarriors.org/glasgow-warriors/player/tommy-seymour

External links 
profile at Scottish Rugby
 
 

1988 births
Living people
Scottish rugby union players
People educated at Down High School
Rugby union wings
Glasgow Warriors players
Ulster Rugby players
Sportspeople from Nashville, Tennessee
Scotland international rugby union players
British & Irish Lions rugby union players from the United States
Marr RFC players
Currie RFC players
American rugby union players